The 1940 Women's Western Open was a golf competition held at Blue Mound Golf & Country Club, the 11th edition of the event. Babe Zaharias won the championship in match play competition by defeating Mrs. Russell Mann in the final match, 5 and 4.

References

Women's Western Open
Golf in Wisconsin
Women's sports in Wisconsin
Women's Western Open
Women's Western Open
Women's Western Open